The Woman of the Chatti, or the Chattian seeress, is an alleged Germanic seeress of the Chattian tribe who according to Suetonius prophesied that Roman Emperor Vitellius (ruled in 69 AD) would reign for a long time if he survived his mother Sextilia. This would have led to Vitellius murdering his aged mother by poison or starvation. No such seeress is mentioned by other sources, and so it may have been a malevolent rumour to justify the coup d'état by Vespasian.

Vitellius did however stay in Cologne near Chattian territory earlier in the year when he became emperor, and may have consulted with a seeress from that tribe.

Matricide 

Around 100 AD, Suetonius wrote that the Roman emperor Vitellius trusted in the prophecies of his seeress, from the Chatti tribe ( (Vit. 14,5)). This was one of the vices attributed to him, and he was also described as a cruel and gluttonous emperor. His seeress promised him a secure and long rule if he would survive his mother Sextilia, and therefore he would have arranged so that his mother died of starvation when she was ill. However, he may also have poisoned her.

Historicity 

There is however no evidence that Sextilia died of unnatural causes, because in 69 AD, she was an infirm woman of about 70. Moreover, Suetonius did not vouch for the information and he only mentions it as a suspicion, and Suetonius is known to have added scandalous rumours in his works.

Vitellius did however, spend a short period as governor of Lower Germania between 1 December 68 and 2 January 69. When Nero committed suicide, on 9 June 68, the empire was politically unstable and Vitellius with his four legions had potential to influence the course of events, for his own benefit or for that of others. He was consequently liable to ask for advice from a range of possible advisors, such as friends and associates, and soothsayers. Vitellius had his headquarters in Cologne (Colonia Claudia Ara Agrippinensium), which was close to the territories of the Chattian tribe, so he may also have consulted people from Germanic tribes who lived in Colonia. It is possible that malicious tongues who learnt of his solicitations distorted the information and combined it with rumours of a matricide, when he had risen to the position of emperor. The information about the alleged matricide may have been forged by Flavian supporters in order to justify the coup d'état by Vespasian.

So the information probably goes back to a source that was not considered trustworthy. The only retrievable fact may be that Suetonius and his contemporaries considered the Chatti to have seeresses.

Notes

Sources 

 
 
 
 
 
 
 
 

Chatti
Germanic seeresses
1st-century women